Several facilities in La Jolla California are named after the Scripps family.
Scripps Institute may refer to:

 TSRI is Scripps Research Institute, established in 1991 for medical and biological research
 Scripps Institution of Oceanography, a division of UC San Diego